Kalocsai or Kalocsay (meaning "from Kalocsa") is a surname. Notable people with the surname include:

Kalocsai 
 Henrik Kalocsai, Hungarian jumper in the 1960s

Kalocsay 
 Géza Kalocsay (1913–2008), Hungarian football (soccer) player and manager
 Kálmán Kalocsay (1891–1976), Hungarian Esperanto-language poet, translator and editor who also used the name Peter Peneter

Hungarian-language surnames
Toponymic surnames
Kalocsa